Julie Coin (born 2 December 1982) is a retired French tennis player.

Coin recorded the biggest win of her career by defeating the then-world No. 1 ranked Ana Ivanovic at the 2008 US Open. Her career-high singles ranking is world No. 60, achieved on 27 July 2009. She peaked at No. 49 in the doubles rankings on 19 April 2010.

Personal life
Her parents, Philippe and Doriane Coin, were competitive team handball players.

Career

Early career
Coin played at Clemson University, where she was an All-American, All-ACC, and ACC Player of the Year. She also holds numerous Clemson Women's Tennis records. Coin graduated from Clemson with a degree in mathematics.

2008
Coin and her doubles partner Violette Huck made it to the second round of the French Open women's doubles draw.
Coin's breakthrough came at the US Open when she was ranked 188th in the world. She entered the main draw as a qualifier after defeating Amanda McDowell, Sesil Karatantcheva, and Elena Baltacha in the qualification rounds. This was the first time she had entered the main draw in singles at a WTA tournament. In the first round, she defeated Australian Casey Dellacqua 7–6, 7–6. Coin then rose to prominence and made worldwide headlines when she defeated world No. 1 and top-seeded Ana Ivanovic in the second round 6–3, 4–6, 6–3. ESPN and Sports Illustrated both called the win one of the greatest upsets in tennis history. Unfortunately, her parents only got to watch highlights of the match since Amélie Mauresmo, who was playing at the same time, was the one shown on French television.

Prior to Coin's upset victory, it had been 41 years since the top-seed had lost so early at the US Open, the previous time being when Maria Bueno lost in the second round of the 1967 U.S. National Championships. At the time of her victory against Ivanovic, Coin was ranked world No. 188.

She then lost 4–6, 4–6 to compatriot Amélie Mauresmo in the third round.

2009
Coin took on Mauresmo in the second round of woman's singles at Brisbane. The women played for approximately 3 hours, with Mauresmo eventually winning 5–7, 6–2, 7–6, after Coin held match points.

Coin beat Elena Vesnina 6–4, 4–6, 6–1 in the first round at the Australian Open.
She fought hard, but ultimately fell to No. 14 Dominika Cibulková in three sets at Wimbledon.

2010
In the first round of the Australian Open, Coin recovered from a set down to defeat local favorite Alicia Molik 3–6, 7–6, 6–3 before losing in straight sets to Francesca Schiavone 3–6, 4–6.

2015
Partnering Emily Webley-Smith, Coin won the $100,000 tournament in February at Midland, defeating Jacqueline Cako and Sachia Vickery in the final. In November, she announced that the 2015 Open de Limoges will be her last professional tournament.

ITF finals

Singles: 22 (10–12)

Doubles: 27 (16–11)

References

External links

 
 

1982 births
Living people
Clemson Tigers women's tennis players
French expatriate sportspeople in the United States
French female tennis players
Sportspeople from Amiens
Universiade medalists in tennis
Universiade bronze medalists for France
Medalists at the 2001 Summer Universiade